Biatora terrae-novae is a species of corticolous (bark-dwelling) crustose lichen in the family Ramalinaceae. It is found in Newfoundland and Labrador, Canada. It was formally described as a new species in 2016 by lichenologists Christian Printzen and John McCarthy. The type specimen was collected along the Route de mon grand-père Trail in Port au Port Peninsula, where it was found growing on moss at base of a stem of balsam fir. The species contains argopsin, and norargopsin as major and minor lichen products, respectively.

References

terrae-novae
Lichen species
Lichens described in 2016
Lichens of Eastern Canada
Fungi without expected TNC conservation status